The S&P 1500, or S&P Composite 1500 Index, is a stock market index of US stocks made by Standard & Poor's. It includes all stocks in the S&P 500, S&P 400, and S&P 600. This index covers approximately 90% of the market capitalization of U.S. stocks.

Other subsets
Standard & Poor's also provides the S&P 900 index (a combination of the S&P 500 Index plus the S&P 400 mid-cap index) and the S&P 1000 (the S&P 400 plus the S&P 600 small-cap index).

Versions
The "S&P 1500" generally quoted is a price return index; there is also "total return" version of the index. These versions differ in how dividends are accounted for. The price return version does not account for dividends; it only captures the changes in the prices of the index components. The total return version reflects the effects of dividend reinvestment.

Annual returns

See also 
 Russell 3000
 S&P 500
 S&P 400
 S&P 600
 Wilshire 5000

References

External links
 Yahoo Finance page for ^SPSUPX
 Standard & Poor's page on S&P 1500 index

1500
American stock market indices